Raffaele Belliazzi (December 9, 1835 – 1917) was an Italian sculptor and painter.

Life and career

He was born in Naples. His father carved architectural decoration. Belliazzi received his first training from Tommaso Solari in Naples, but followed the styles of  Alfonso Balzico and Stanislao Lista.

Belliazzi completed one of the statues, of King Charles III of Spain, outside of the Royal Palace of Naples. In 1869 at Naples and in 1870 at Parma, he exhibited a Pinzochera in terra cotta, for which he was awarded a silver medal.  In 1872 in Milan, he exhibited a Springtime, which had genre characteristics and depicted Neapolitan peasants. In 1873 at Vienna he exhibited an expressive Orfanella. For other works, he earned a gold medal at the 1874 Esposizione of Florence. At the 1877 Esposizione of Naples, he exhibited a Riposo del pastore and a group L'avvicinarsi della procella (Capodimonte Museum). When this latter sculptural group was exhibited as a marble sculpture at the Esposizione of Naples, it won a first prize, gold medal at the World's Exhibition in Paris in 1878, and another at the 1880 Monaco exhibition. The Italian government awarded him knighthood in the Order of the Crown of Italy. At the 1880 Mostra of Turin, he exhibited a statuette titled Chicken Salesman. At the Mostra nazionale of Milan and the promotrice of Naples, he exhibited a Rigido marzo.

From 1895–96 to 1912 he was professor of ornamental decoration at the Academy of Fine Arts of Naples. He died in 1917 in Naples.

References

1835 births
1917 deaths
19th-century Neapolitan people
20th-century Italian sculptors
20th-century Italian male artists
19th-century Italian sculptors
19th-century Italian male artists
Italian male sculptors